The 1967 Scheldeprijs was the 54th edition of the Scheldeprijs cycle race and was held on 1 August 1967. The race was won by Paul In 't Ven.

General classification

References

1967
1967 in road cycling
1967 in Belgian sport